Sanat Naft Novin Abadan Football Club is an Iranian football club based in Abadan, Iran. They currently compete in the 2015–16 Iran Football's 2nd Division. They are the reserve side of Sanat Naft Abadan FC.

Season-by-Season

The table below shows the achievements of the club in various competitions.

First-team squad
As of Jun 29, 2016

See also
 2011-12 Hazfi Cup
 2011–12 Iran Football's 2nd Division

External links
  Official club website

Football clubs in Iran
Association football clubs established in 2007
2007 establishments in Iran
Abadan, Iran
Sport in Khuzestan Province